Lyon Dubaï City is a project being developed by the city of Dubai in the United Arab Emirates.

The project

The project “Lyon-Dubai City” began with a meeting between Buti Saeed Al Ghandi, chairman of Emivest, and decision makers of the city of Lyon.
 During a trip to Lyon a promoter from the United States, Buti Saeed al-Gandhi, became fond of the city. He thought of the idea of the construction of a neighborhood that would recreate the atmosphere of Lyon and some of its notable buildings in Dubai.
 Aiming to increase the international influence of Lyon, the Mayor Gérard Collomb signed an agreement with al-Gandhi on 9 January 2008.

References

Buildings and structures in Lyon
Culture in Dubai